Norman Penner (February 21, 1921 - April 16, 2009) was professor emeritus at York University, a writer and historian, a war veteran and a former activist in the Communist Party of Canada and the Labor-Progressive Party who broke with the party as a result of the events of 1956.

Penner was the son of Jacob Penner, a leading member of the Communist Party and popular Winnipeg alderman.  He graduated from high school in 1937 and then worked from 1938 to 1941 as the full-time officer for the Winnipeg branch of the Communist Party.

He enlisted in the Canadian Army in 1941 and served overseas during World War II as a signalman. When he returned home in 1947, he became an organizer in Toronto for the Labor-Progressive Party as the Communist Party was then known. He ran in the 1951 Ontario election in York South and the 1953 federal election in York South finishing with 877 and 755 votes respectively. He also ran for reeve of York Township in the 1954 and 1955 municipal elections, coming in third and fourth place, respectively.

He broke with the party in 1957 as a result of the Soviet invasion of Hungary and Nikita Khrushchev's Secret Speech the previous year, events which caused the disillusionment of many party members.

After leaving the party he worked for several years as a salesman in the electrical heating business. In 1964, he decided to go back to school part-time and enrolled in political science at the University of Toronto at the age of 41 going on to earn a BA, MA and PhD.

Penner was hired as a lecturer at York University's Glendon College in 1972 and soon became a professor and head of the political science department, continuing to teach until 1995.

He has written extensively on the Canadian left. Penner, discovered the long forgotten manuscript, then edited and introduced Winnipeg 1919: The Strikers' Own History of the Winnipeg General Strike in 1973, published The Canadian Left: A Critical Analysis in 1977 and contributed three chapters to as well as editing Keeping Canada Together Means Changing Our Thinking in 1978. He published Canadian Communism: The Stalin Years and Beyond in 1988 and From Protest to Power: Social Democracy in Canada 1900 to Present in 1992 as well as numerous articles, reviews and book chapters.

His brother, Roland Penner, was also a Communist activist in his youth and later served as Attorney-General of Manitoba.

References

External links
Death Notice

Canadian socialists
Canadian Marxists
1921 births
2009 deaths
Canadian political writers
Academic staff of York University
Canadian male non-fiction writers
Labor-Progressive Party candidates in the 1953 Canadian federal election
20th-century Canadian historians
Canadian Army personnel of World War II
Canadian military personnel
Royal Canadian Corps of Signals soldiers
Academic staff of Glendon College